This is a list of villages located in Jayal Tehsil, Rajasthan State, India.

Aheerpura
Ajabpura
Akora
Ambali
Khidarpura
Arsinga
Bagrasar
Balaji Nagar
Barnel
Barsuna
Batwari
Berasar
Bhawla
Bhiniyad
Bhiniyad Chak-1(A)
Bodind Kalan
Bodind Khurd
Borwa
Boseri
Bugarda
Burdi
Chawad
Chawali
Chhajoli
Chhapra
Chhawata Kalan
Chhawata Khurd
Danta
Deediya Kalan
Deediya Khurd
Deh
Dehroli
Dhanani
Dharna
Dhatiyad
Dheejpura
Dhehari
Dodoo
Dotina
Dugastau, Rajasthan
Dugoli
Ewad
Firozpura
Gadriya
Geloli
Gorau
Goth
Gugriyali
Gujariyawas
Gumanpura
Gurharohili
Hirasani
Igyar
Jakhan
Jalniyasar
Janewa (East)
Janewa (West)
Janwas
Jayal
Jhalalar
Jhareli
Jocheena
Jyani
Kachras
Kalvi
Kameriya
Kangsiya
Kasari
Kashipura
Kasnau
Kathoti
Khabariyana
Khanpura Manjra
Khangar
Khara Manjra
Khari Jodha
Khatoo Kalan
Kheraheerawas
Kherat
Khinyala
Khinyawas
Kishanpura
Kunwar Khera
Kubota
Manglod
Matasukh
Meetha Manjra
Merwas
Moti Nagar
Mundi
Mundiyau
Neem Nagar
Nimbora
Nokha Jodha
Nooriyas
Nosariya
Pannapura
Peendiya
Phardod
Piriyara
Rajod
Rampura-A
Rampura-B
Ramsar
Ratanga
Rohina
Rol
Rooniya
Rotoo
Sandeela
Sedau
Shivnagar
Silariya
Somana
Soneli
Surpaliya
Suwadiya
Talniyau
Tangla
Tangli
Tanwara
Tarnau
Tatarwa
Tatarwi
Tejasar
Ubasi
Unchaira

References

Nagaur district, Jayal Tehsil villages

Jayal Tehsil